Professor of Greek may refer to:

 Professor of Greek (Glasgow), renamed to the MacDowell Professor of Greek in 2012
 Professor of Greek (University College London)

See also

 Gladstone Professor of Greek
 Regius Professor of Greek (disambiguation)